Schizoculina  is a genus of reef-building stony corals in the family Oculinidae.

Species
The following species are included in the genus according to the World Register of Marine Species:

 Schizoculina africana (Thiel, 1928)
 Schizoculina fissipara (Milne Edwards & Haime, 1850)

References

Oculinidae
Scleractinia genera